There were four special elections to the United States House of Representatives in 1957 during the 85th United States Congress.

List of elections 
Elections are listed by date and district.

|- 
| 
| Antonio M. Fernández
|  | Democratic
| 1942
|  | Incumbent member-elect died November 7, 1956.New member elected April 9, 1957.Democratic hold.
| nowrap | 

|- 
| 
| T. Millet Hand
|  | Republican
| 1944
|  | Incumbent member-elect died during previous congress.New member elected November 5, 1957.Republican hold.
| nowrap | 

|- 
| 
| Samuel K. McConnell, Jr.
|  | Republican
| 1944  
|  | Incumbent resigned September 1, 1957, after becoming Executive Director of the United Cerebral Palsy Associations.New member elected November 5, 1957.Republican hold.
| nowrap | 

|- 
| 
| James Bowler
|  | Democratic
| 1953  
|  | Incumbent died July 18, 1957.New member elected December 31, 1957.Democratic hold.
| nowrap | 

|}

See also 
 1957 United States Senate elections

References 

 
1957